Andrzej Michał Strejlau (born 19 February 1940) is a retired Polish football and handball player.

In 1989–1993 he was a coach of Poland national football team. He also coached many teams from different parts of the world (China, Iceland, Greece)

He has coached Poland U-21, Legia Warszawa, Zagłębie Sosnowiec, Knattspyrnufélagið Fram, Larissa, and Zagłębie Lubin.

He was later a member of the suspended board of PZPN.

References

1940 births
Living people
Polish footballers
Footballers from Warsaw
Association football defenders
Gwardia Warsaw players
Polish football managers
Legia Warsaw managers
Zagłębie Sosnowiec managers
Knattspyrnufélagið Fram managers
Athlitiki Enosi Larissa F.C. managers
Poland national football team managers
Zagłębie Lubin managers
Shanghai Shenhua F.C. managers
Polish male handball players
Polish expatriate football managers
Expatriate football managers in Iceland
Polish expatriate sportspeople in Iceland
Expatriate football managers in Greece
Polish expatriate sportspeople in Greece
Expatriate football managers in China
Polish expatriate sportspeople in China